9/11 is a 2002 documentary film about the September 11 attacks in New York City, in which two planes were flown into the buildings of the World Trade Center, resulting in their destruction and the deaths of nearly 3,000 people.  The film is from the point of view of the New York City Fire Department. The film was directed by brothers Jules and Gédéon Naudet and FDNY firefighter James Hanlon and produced by Susan Zirinsky of CBS News.

Synopsis

Filmmakers James Hanlon and the Naudet brothers were given permission by New York City Fire Department to film a documentary about a probationary firefighter. Their subject was Antonios (Tony) Benetatos, who was assigned to the Engine 7/Ladder 1/Battalion 1 Firehouse on Duane Street in Lower Manhattan. They intended to make a film about the "probie's" first experiences as a firefighter. On the morning of September 11, the firehouse, under the direction of Battalion Chief Joseph W. Pfeifer, was called out on a reported "odor of gas" at Church and Lispenard streets. Jules Naudet rode with Pfeifer to investigate, while Gédéon stayed behind at the firehouse to film the "probie."

As the Battalion 1 firefighters examined the supposed gas leak, American Airlines Flight 11 flew overhead. Turning his camera to follow the plane, Jules Naudet taped one of only three known recordings of the first plane hitting the North Tower (Tower 1) of the World Trade Center during the terrorist attacks on September 11, 2001. (The others were shot by Czech tourist Pavel Hlava and German Wolfgang Staehle, but both were filmed from farther away and from a worse angle. The second was also only a sequence of still frames.) The firefighters under the direction of Chief Pfeifer were the first responders on the scene. Naudet was allowed to follow the chief during the attempted rescue operation. Naudet, Chief Pfeifer and several other FDNY chiefs were inside the lobby of Tower 1 when Tower 2 was hit by the second aircraft and when Tower 2 eventually collapsed.

While the events at the World Trade Center unfolded, Gédéon Naudet filmed Benetatos, who was assigned to stay at the firehouse, where he was the only firefighter for some time. After the first tower collapse, Benetatos, together with retired former fire chief Larry Byrnes, left the firehouse for World Trade Center. Naudet lost contact with them and filmed the streets near World Trade Center, being held back by police officers from getting closer to the scene and to his missing brother. Later he again filmed at the firehouse, as more and more firefighters got back and tried to deal with the disaster. After some time of uncertainty, his brother arrived, and later also "probie" Benetatos, as the last one of the firefighter team. Benetatos had stayed at the scene after the second tower collapse, searching the debris for survivors until around 6 pm. Everyone of the team survived.

The film gives various firemen's accounts of the events of the remainder of the day: from the initial crash to the building's collapse, to the attempts to rescue the few survivors from the rubble, as well as the aftermath of the events and acknowledging those who were lost, including Chief Pfeifer's brother, Engine 33 Lieutenant Kevin Pfeifer.

Release and reception 

CBS aired 9/11 commercial-free on March 10, 2002, to mark six months since the attacks. It was produced by Susan Zirinksy. The film was watched by 39.4 million viewers, bringing in a rating/share of 22.3/33, and was the highest-rated program that week. Hosted by actor Robert De Niro, CBS's broadcast was repeated on the first anniversary as well. The film aired in 103 countries in 2002 alone.

The film was noted for the subjects' use of profanity. Under regular circumstances on American broadcast media, this language would have been subject to censorship by the broadcaster or the Federal Communications Commission. At the time of the documentary's broadcast, the FCC took no action against the network for violating indecency rules, because it believed such action would have a negative connotation and would be interpreted as sanitizing history.

In addition, a 2006 ruling by a federal appeals court had successfully granted a "temporary halt" to the FCC's enforcement of its indecency rules. This allowed CBS and any affiliates to air the documentary without edits and without fear of facing stiff fines.

The DVD of the documentary was released in proximity, with De Niro's footage edited from it. CBS re-aired the film, hosted again by De Niro, on September 10, 2006, the night before the fifth anniversary of the attacks. This version contained updates from the principal subjects of the documentary, as of 2006.

On September 11, 2011, CBS broadcast 9/11: Ten Years Later, once again hosted by De Niro. The aftershow was updated by the Naudet brothers, Hanlon and CBS News producer Susan Zirinsky to include new interviews and footage on the lives of those who had been shown in the documentary ten years later. The program also focused on the construction of the new One World Trade Center, and on the health problems faced by many of the firemen who had served at Ground Zero, where they were exposed to burning contaminants. DeNiro was joined by the Naudet brothers and James Hanlon, a former New York fireman-turned-film director who was also present that day. As with all previous broadcasts of the film, CBS aired repeated viewer discretion warnings before and during the broadcast.

In 2016, CNN picked up the rights to show the film for the fifteenth anniversary of the attacks, executive produced and directed and updates by James Hanlon, this time hosted by Denis Leary.

Awards
9/11 was nominated for and won many awards, including an Emmy for Outstanding Non-Fiction Special (Informational) and a Peabody Award.

References

External links 

2002 films
2002 documentary films
2002 television films
American documentary television films
CBS network films
Documentary films about the September 11 attacks
Films about firefighting
New York City Fire Department
Films about high-rise fires
Primetime Emmy Award-winning broadcasts
2000s English-language films
2000s American films